Gravlax or graved salmon is a Nordic dish consisting of salmon that is cured using a mix of salt and sugar, and either dill or sprucetwigs placed on top, and may occasionally be cold-smoked afterwards.

Etymology
The word  comes from the Northern Germanic word  ('to dig'; modern sense 'to cure (fish)') which goes back to the Proto-Germanic ,  ('hole in the ground; ditch, trench; grave') and the Indo-European root  'to dig, to scratch, to scrape', and /, 'salmon'.

History
During the Middle Ages, gravlax was made by fishermen, who salted the salmon and lightly fermented it by burying it in the sand above the high-tide line.

Fermentation is no longer used in the production process. Instead the salmon is "buried" in a dry marinade of salt, sugar, and dill, and cured for between twelve hours and a few days. As the salmon cures, by the action of osmosis, the moisture turns the dry cure into a highly concentrated brine, which can be used in Scandinavian cooking as part of a sauce. This same method of curing can be employed for any fatty fish, but salmon is the most commonly used.

See also

References

Bibliography
 .

External links

Danish cuisine
Finnish cuisine
Icelandic cuisine
Norwegian cuisine
Salmon dishes
Swedish cuisine
Swedish words and phrases
Appetizers